Kristina Mladenovic and Galina Voskoboeva were the defending champions, but they chose not to participate this year.
Lara Arruabarrena and María Teresa Torró Flor won the title, defeating Andrea Hlaváčková and Lucie Hradecká in the final, 7–6(7–2), 5–7, [13–11].

Seeds

Draw

Draw

References
 Main Draw

2015 Abierto Mexicano Telcel